The Geographical Society of Philadelphia was founded by Angelo Heilprin in 1891 "to promote the discovery and appreciation of the many wonders of our world." Through grants, it has supported major explorations. It also sponsors educational programs related to geography, science, and history.

It awards the Elisha Kent Kane Gold Medal, named for Elisha Kane, "for eminent geographical research." Recipients have included Robert E. Peary (1902), Robert F. Scott (1904), Roald Amundsen (1907), Ernest Shackleton (1910), Ellsworth Huntington (1916), Vilhjalmur Stefansson (1919), Richard E. Byrd (1926), Thor Heyerdahl, Alexander H. Rice, Jr. and Rachel Carson.

Publications 
Bulletin of the Geographical Society of Philadelphia

References

External links 
 

Geographic societies
Non-profit organizations based in Pennsylvania
Scientific societies based in the United States
1891 establishments in Pennsylvania